Couas are large, mostly terrestrial birds of the cuckoo family, endemic to the island of Madagascar.

Couas are reminiscent of African turacos when walking along tree branches, and they likewise feature brightly coloured bare skin around the eyes. Some resemble coucals in their habit of clambering through jungle while foraging, while the arboreal species move between tree canopies with gliding flight. Four species have been recorded in rainforests while the remaining six are found in the dry forests of western and southern Madagascar.

They have large feet, with a reversible third toe like all cuckoos. Their long tibia suggest a relationship with the Carpococcyx ground-cuckoos of Asia, a genus with similar nestlings. Consequently, they are sometimes united in the subfamily Couinae. Couas build their own nests and lay white eggs. Couas' calls are a short series of evenly-spaced notes, which are sometimes answered by other individuals.

Taxonomy
The genus Coua was erected by the Swiss naturalist Heinrich Rudolf Schinz in 1821 with the Cuculus madagascariensis (a synonym of Cuculus gigas) as the type species. The name is from koa, the Malagasy word for the couas.

Species
There are nine extant species placed in the genus:

Fossils and extinct species
 Ancient coua, Coua primaeva – prehistoric
 Bertha's coua, Coua berthae – only known from Holocene fossil remains
 Delalande's coua, or the snail-eating coua Coua delalandei – extinct (late 19th century)

References

 Birds of the Indian Ocean Islands, Sinclair and Langrand, 1998.

External links
 Birds of Madagascar, including Couas

 
Bird genera